Oliver Mason is a British actor and voiceover artist who lives in London. He began acting with The Guildhall School of Music and Drama aged six in his hometown of Norwich. He trained at the National Youth Theatre, Middlesex University, the University of South Florida and the Webber Douglas Academy of Dramatic Art in London. Oliver has had leading roles in BBC's The Mysti Show, The West End production of The Bomb-itty of Errors and the American Feature The 7 Adventures of Sinbad. Other work includes roles in Red Dwarf, EastEnders and 'From Bard to Verse' on BBC and Twelfth Night and A Midsummer Night's Dream in London's West End. Oliver voices the lead character of Moss in the international cartoon series Lilybuds.

Audio plays include Sonny for Big Finish Productions in Torchwood (Big Finish series): Corpse Day, Kubal/Sordo in Doctor Who: The New Adventures of Bernice Summerfield for Big Finish Productions, Danuka in Doctor Who for Big Finish Productions and Dresus in 'Cicero'.

Oliver is also a prolific voiceover artist having voiced on hundreds of commercials, narrations, audio guides, cartoons, TV stations and computer games. Oliver has voiced for The Disney Channel, the character of Tink for Nickelodeon's Bin Weevils and for many computer games, including, Chief Inquistor in Dragon Age: Inquisition, Lucien in Ni no Kuni: Wrath of the White Witch, Peter in Professor Layton and the Azran Legacy, Ratux in Soul Sacrifice (video game), Inazuma Eleven 3, Inazuma Eleven 7 & Inazuma Eleven. Oliver has provided his voice for audio guides in many famous landmarks, including, Buckingham Palace, The Royal Mews, Louvre and Hever Castle.

Film/television credits 

 'Time Rewind' (Marcus)
"Lilybuds" (Moss)
'BroBots' (Otis)
"Red Dwarf" (Asclepius)
 'Ctrl' (Dom)
 'Untitled' (Michael Arieta) 
 Sinbad: The Persian Prince (Alex Degraves)
The 7 Adventures of Sinbad (Alex Degraves) 
EastEnders (Estate Agent)
Bin Weevils (Tink) 
 'Jam' (Paul) 
The Mysti Show (Rick) 
 'From Bard to Verse' (The Three Witches & Various) 
Kensington Gore (Mona)

Theatre credits 

Ctrl. (Dom 'Dominator' Williams) RADA Studios.
The Bomb-itty of Errors (Dromio of Ephesus, Luciana and Various, UK Cast) New Ambassadors Theatre, West End.
 'Lorrenzaccio' (Tebaldeo/Scoronconcolo) The Young Vic. 
Twelfth Night (Sir Toby Belch & Sebastian) Bloomsbury Theatre.
A Midsummer Night's Dream (Bottom) Bloomsbury Theatre.

Voice overs include 
Santander
 Currys
 eBay
 Kellogg's
 Seat Cars
 Morrisons
 Nino Kuni (Video Game)
 Dragonage (Video Game)
 Inazuma Striker (Video Game)
 Soul Sacrifice (Video Game)
 Professor Layton (Video Game)
 Birdseye Fish Fingers
 The Only Way is Essex
 BBC Worldwide 
 BT
 T-Mobile
 Nissan
 Virgin Media
 MTV
 VIVA
 See Saw
 The Royal Mews
 ESPN
 Channel 5
 Buckingham Palace
 Disney Channel UK
 The Guardian
 Lockets
 Le Louvre Museum
 Oxford University
 Hornby Trains
 Malcolm in the Middle
 Baby Bell
 Nickelodeon
 Carling
 Head and Shoulders
 GMTV
 Thomas Cook

Audio work 

Grant/Danuka in Big Finish Productions Doctor Who
Dresus in Big Finish Productions Cicero
Sordo/Kubal in Big Finish Productions Doctor Who: The New Adventures of Bernice Summerfield
 Sonny in Big Finish Productions Torchwood (Big Finish series): Corpse Day
Presenter (James) for Buckingham Palace Family Tour
Presenter (Alex) for Royal Mews Family Tour
Presenter (Tanis) for Le Louvre Family Tour (English)

Others

Oliver is a very exprecienced Drama Facilitator.

References
 Sue Terry Voices
 
 BBC Press Release
 Oliver Mason on The Spotlight
 The 7 Adventures of Sinbad

Big Finish Productions

External links
 
 The Mysti Show at the Internet Movie Database
From Bard to Verse at the Internet Movie Database
 Official Bomb-itty site
 Twitter 

1979 births
Living people
Actors from Norwich
Alumni of the Webber Douglas Academy of Dramatic Art
Alumni of Middlesex University
British male stage actors
British male television actors
National Youth Theatre members